The El Cajón Dam is a hydroelectric dam on the Río Grande de Santiago in the Mexican state of Nayarit. Construction began in 2003 and was completed in June 2007. It cost US$800 million to build. The dam is operated by the Comisión Federal de Electricidad, a state-owned Mexican electric company. Throughout the construction of the El Cajón Dam, the following is estimated:

 Rock fill with concrete face dam
 A cost of 800 million dollars
 An economic benefit of 2 billion pesos (160 million dollars)
 The creation of approximately 10,000 direct and indirect jobs
 The improvement of access roads that will benefit up to 20,000 inhabitants belonging to 40 communities
 An annual mean power generation of 1,228 GWh, approximately 1.5 times the annual consumption of Nayarit
 An installed capacity of 
 An approximate annual savings of two million barrels of fuel oil
 An increase in the firm power generation of the Aguamilpa Hydroelectric Station, due to the regulation of the Río Grande de Santiago and its effluents in the basin, as well as the diversification of the primary energy sources in the National Electric System.

See also 

 List of power stations in Mexico

References

External links 
 Comisión Federal de Electricidad

Dams in Mexico
Hydroelectric power stations in Mexico
Buildings and structures in Nayarit
Concrete-face rock-fill dams
Dams completed in 2007
Dams on the Río Grande de Santiago
2007 establishments in Mexico
Energy infrastructure completed in 2012